Gerhard Körner (born 20 September 1941) is a German former footballer.

He played 276 matches in the Oberliga and scored 50 goals for Vorwärts Berlin and FC Vorwärts Frankfurt/Oder respectively.

Gerhard Körner won 33 caps for East Germany.

References

External links
 
 

1941 births
Living people
People from Zwickau
German footballers
Association football midfielders
East German footballers
East Germany international footballers
Olympic footballers of the United Team of Germany
Olympic bronze medalists for the United Team of Germany
Olympic medalists in football
Footballers at the 1964 Summer Olympics
Medalists at the 1964 Summer Olympics
1. FC Frankfurt players
1. FC Union Berlin managers
DDR-Oberliga players
Footballers from Saxony
German football managers